Patrimony is a 2018 Czech comedy film directed by Jiří Vejdělek.

Cast
 Eliška Balzerová as Eva
 Tatiana Vilhelmová as Tereza
 Vilma Cibulková as Kamila
 Eva Holubová
 Hana Maciuchová
 Emília Vášáryová 
 Martin Myšička as Tereza's Husband
 Bolek Polívka as Ludvík
 Jana Plodková
 Václav Neužil
 Dominika Frydrychová
 Ivana Uhlířová

References

External links
 

2018 films
2018 comedy films
2010s Czech-language films
Czech comedy films